Alfredo Nascimento may refer to:
Alfredo Nascimento (politician) (born 1952), Brazilian politician
Alfredo Nascimento (footballer) (born 1937), Portuguese footballer